Sam Reid  (born 27 December 1991) is an Australian rules footballer who plays for the Sydney Swans in the Australian Football League (AFL). He was drafted to Sydney with the 38th selection in the 2009 AFL draft, becoming a third generation footballer at AFL/VFL level. His grandfather Bruce Reid senior played for Footscray, his father Bruce Reid, for Footscray and Carlton and his uncle John Reid for Melbourne, Footscray and Sydney. He is also the younger brother of Collingwood premiership player Ben Reid.

Reid made one senior appearance in his first season at the Swans, making his debut in Round 22, 2010 against the Brisbane Lions he finished the match with 13 disposals, 8 marks and a goal. In 2011, Reid played all but one game and consistently displayed his athleticism and contested marking ability while playing in one of the most difficult positions on the field, at centre half-forward. In round 12, he was nominated for the 2011 AFL Rising Star after a strong performance against  in which he kicked 2 goals and 5 behinds. Reid showed enormous promise during his first full season in the AFL and was rewarded with Swans Rising Star Award at the club's end of year awards night.

2012 proved to be an up and down year personally for Reid as he continued to come to terms with the greater attention thrust his way from experienced defenders. He kicked a career-high 6 goals against Brisbane Lions at the SCG during a season that culminated with him being part of the Swans' premiership side. He kicked one goal in the 2012 AFL Grand Final victory over Hawthorn Hawks.

Personal life 
Reid grew up in Bright in Northeast Victoria, attending, he attended Galen Catholic College for his final years of high school to train with the Murray Bushrangers. Reid married long time girlfriend Kimberley in 2017. Their first child, a boy, Saxon was born in 2019.

Statistics 
Updated to the end of the 2022 season.

|-
| 2010 ||  || 20
| 1 || 1 || 1 || 9 || 4 || 13 || 8 || 1 || 0 || 1.0 || 1.0 || 9.0 || 4.0 || 13.0 || 8.0 || 1.0 || 0.0 || 0
|-
| 2011 ||  || 20
| 23 || 22 || 26 || 143 || 97 || 240 || 106 || 45 || 0 || 1.0 || 1.1 || 6.2 || 4.2 || 10.4 || 4.6 || 2.0 || 0.0 || 0
|-
| scope=row bgcolor=F0E68C | 2012# ||  || 20
| 22 || 31 || 19 || 115 || 91 || 206 || 68 || 43 || 0 || 1.4 || 0.9 || 5.2 || 4.1 || 9.4 || 3.1 || 2.0 || 0.0 || 2
|-
| 2013 ||  || 20
| 10 || 7 || 4 || 61 || 47 || 108 || 38 || 24 || 0 || 0.7 || 0.4 || 6.1 || 4.7 || 10.8 || 3.8 || 2.4 || 0.0 || 0
|-
| 2014 ||  || 20
| 20 || 17 || 9 || 100 || 106 || 206 || 68 || 48 || 46 || 0.9 || 0.5 || 5.0 || 5.3 || 10.3 || 3.4 || 2.4 || 2.3 || 0
|-
| 2015 ||  || 20
| 10 || 3 || 3 || 62 || 63 || 125 || 51 || 22 || 52 || 0.3 || 0.3 || 6.2 || 6.3 || 12.5 || 5.1 || 2.2 || 2.4 || 2
|-
| 2016 ||  || 20
| 0 || – || – || – || – || – || – || – || – || – || – || – || – || – || – || – || – || –
|-
| 2017 ||  || 20
| 22 || 30 || 17 || 166 || 115 || 281 || 134 || 30 || 36 || 1.4 || 0.8 || 7.5 || 5.2 || 12.8 || 6.1 || 1.4 || 1.6 || 3
|-
| 2018 ||  || 20
| 1 || 2 || 2 || 11 || 1 || 12 || 6 || 3 || 0 || 2.0 || 2.0 || 11.0 || 1.0 || 12.0 || 6.0 || 3.0 || 0.0 || 0
|-
| 2019 ||  || 20
| 22 || 28 || 13 || 143 || 109 || 252 || 110 || 63 || 126 || 1.3 || 0.6 || 6.5 || 5.0 || 11.5 || 5.0 || 2.9 || 5.7 || 4
|-
| 2020 ||  || 20
| 10 || 5 || 6 || 43 || 41 || 84 || 38 || 16 || 26 || 0.5 || 0.6 || 4.3 || 4.1 || 8.4 || 3.8 || 1.6 || 2.6 || 0
|-
| 2021 ||  || 20
| 10 || 6 || 6 || 62 || 47 || 109 || 45 || 28 || 78 || 0.6 || 0.6 || 6.2 || 4.7 || 10.9 || 4.5 || 2.8 || 7.8 || 0
|-
| 2022 ||  || 20
| 18 || 18 || 20 || 108 || 93 || 201 || 72 || 73 || 126 || 1.0 || 1.1 || 6.0 || 5.2 || 11.2 || 4.0 || 4.1 || 7.0 || 2
|- class=sortbottom
! colspan=3 | Career
! 181 !! 183 !! 136 !! 1108 !! 900 !! 2008 !! 821 !! 427 !! 490 !! 1.0 !! 0.8 !! 6.1 !! 5.0 !! 11.1 !! 4.5 !! 2.4 !! 2.7 !! 13
|}

Honours and achievements
Team
 AFL premiership player: 2012
 2× McClelland Trophy: 2014, 2016

Individual
 AFL Rising Star nominee: 2011 (round 12)

References

External links 

Sydney Swans players
Sydney Swans Premiership players
Living people
1991 births
Australian rules footballers from Victoria (Australia)
Murray Bushrangers players
Wangaratta Rovers Football Club players
One-time VFL/AFL Premiership players